Richard Socrier (born 28 March 1979) is a Guadeloupe professional footballer from France, who plays as a striker for French AS Poissy.

International career
Socrier made his debut for Guadeloupe at the CONCACAF Gold Cup finals in June 2007 against Haiti.

References

External links
 
 

1979 births
Living people
Footballers from Paris
French footballers
Guadeloupean footballers
Association football forwards
2007 CONCACAF Gold Cup players
2011 CONCACAF Gold Cup players
Football Bourg-en-Bresse Péronnas 01 players
Stade Lavallois players
AS Cherbourg Football players
FC Metz players
LB Châteauroux players
Stade Brestois 29 players
AC Ajaccio players
Angers SCO players
Paris FC players
AS Poissy players
Ligue 1 players
Ligue 2 players
Championnat National players
French people of Guadeloupean descent
Guadeloupe international footballers